Grozden Peak is the rocky peak rising to 1193 m in the west foothills of Hemimont Plateau on Fallières Coast in Graham Land, Antarctica. It surmounts Kom Glacier and its tributaries to the south, west and north.

The peak is named after the settlement of Grozden in Southeastern Bulgaria.

Location
British mapping in 1978.

Maps
Antarctic Digital Database (ADD). Scale 1:250000 topographic map of Antarctica. Scientific Committee on Antarctic Research (SCAR). Since 1993, regularly upgraded and updated.
British Antarctic Territory. Scale 1:200000 topographic map. DOS 610 Series, Sheet W 67 66. Directorate of Overseas Surveys, Tolworth, UK, 1978.

Notes

References
 Bulgarian Antarctic Gazetteer. Antarctic Place-names Commission. (details in Bulgarian, basic data in English)
Grozden Peak. SCAR Composite Antarctic Gazetteer.

External links
 Grozden Peak. Copernix satellite image
 village of Grozden in Bulgaria, Sungurlare municipalities' Grozden

Mountains of Graham Land
Bulgaria and the Antarctic
Fallières Coast